Condensed matter may refer to:

Condensed matter physics, a subdivision of the physical sciences
 Scientific journals:
 European Physical Journal B: Condensed Matter and Complex Systems
 Journal of Physics: Condensed Matter
 Physics of Condensed Matter, Springer-Verlag publication until its 1975 merger into European Physical Journal